Zbigniew Kwiatkowski (born 2 April 1985, in Mława) is a Polish handballer who plays for Energa MKS Kalisz and the Polish national team.

References

External links
 Profile at Wisła Płock official website

1985 births
Living people
Polish male handball players
People from Mława
Sportspeople from Masovian Voivodeship